James Mahoney may refer to:

 James Mahony (1810–1879), Irish artist and engraver
 James Mahoney (politician) (1873–1938), British priest and politician
James Mahoney (1958–2020), American pulmonologist and internist
 James Patrick Mahoney (New York bishop) (1925–2002), American bishop
 James Patrick Mahoney (1927–1995), Canadian bishop
 James E. Mahoney (1858–1926), United States Marine Corps officer